The Men's 3.000 metres Steeplechase event at the 2007 World Championships in Athletics took place on August 26, 2007 (heats) and August 28, 2007 (final) at the Nagai Stadium in Osaka, Japan.

Medalists

Records
Prior to the competition, the following records were as follows.

Schedule

Results

Heats
Qualification: First 3 in each heat(Q) and the next 6 fastest(q) advance to the semifinals.

Final

References
Official results, heats - IAAF.org
Official results, final - IAAF.org
Event report - IAAF.org

3000 metres steeplechase
Steeplechase at the World Athletics Championships